Take Me Back may refer to:

 Take Me Back (album), a 1975 album by Andraé Crouch
 "Take Me Back" (Imperials song), 1965
 "Take Me Back" (Noiseworks song), 1987
 "Take Me Back" (Tinchy Stryder song), 2009
 "Take Me Back", a song by Bryan Adams from Cuts Like a Knife
 "Take Me Back", a song by Erasure from I Say, I Say, I Say
 "Take Me Back", a song by Irving Berlin
 "Take Me Back", a song by Michael Jackson from Forever, Michael
 "Take Me Back", a song by Story of the Year from In the Wake of Determination
 "Take Me Back", a song by Tracy Spencer, 1987
 "Take Me Back", a song by Van Morrison from the album Hymns to the Silence, performed by Jennifer Jason Leigh in the film Georgia